Rakhni is town and union council of Barkhan District in the Balochistan province of Pakistan. It is located at 30°3'0N 69°55'0E at an altitude of 1093 metres (3589 feet).

References

Populated places in Barkhan District
Union councils of Balochistan, Pakistan